"I Know Where I'm Going" is a song written by Craig Bickhardt, Don Schlitz and Brent Maher, and recorded by American country music duo The Judds.  It was released in April 1987 as the second single from the album Heartland.  The song was their ninth number one on the country chart.  The single went to number one for one week and spent a total of thirteen weeks on the country chart.

Charts
"I Know Where I'm Going" debuted on the U.S. Billboard Hot Country Singles & Tracks for the week of May 9, 1987.

References

1987 singles
1987 songs
The Judds songs
Songs written by Don Schlitz
Songs written by Craig Bickhardt
RCA Records singles
Curb Records singles
Songs written by Brent Maher
Song recordings produced by Brent Maher